Roko Blažević (born 10 March 2000), also known as Roko, is a Croatian pop singer. He represented Croatia at the Eurovision Song Contest 2019 with the song "The Dream", having won Dora 2019.

Early life
Blažević was born in Split to mother, Marija Saratlija-Blažević, a singer, and a father, Mario Blažević, also a singer, of the klapa genre. His brother plays upright bass. Roko's ex-girlfriend, Andrea Aužina, has participated in the same season of Zvijezde and in the third season of The Voice Hrvatska.

Career
In July 2017, Blažević won the Serbian reality show Pinkove Zvezdice, as well as in December 2018, he won the second place in the Croatian reality-show, Zvijezde. On 16 February 2019, Blažević won Dora 2019 with the song "The Dream", and afterwards he went on to represent Croatia in the Eurovision Song Contest 2019, but failed to qualify from the second semi-final, placing 14th with 64 points.

Discography

Singles

References

Eurovision Song Contest entrants of 2019
Eurovision Song Contest entrants for Croatia
Living people
2000 births
21st-century Croatian male singers
Croatian pop singers
Musicians from Split, Croatia